The Rape of Europa is a 1628-29 oil on canvas painted by Flemish artist Peter Paul Rubens, now in the Prado Museum, in Madrid. It is a copy of a 1562 work on the same subject by Titian.

Bibliography
Palais des Beux-Arts de Lille(2004) RUBENS

References

Paintings by Peter Paul Rubens in the Museo del Prado
1629 paintings
Paintings of Europa (consort of Zeus)
Fish in art
Water in art
Paintings based on Metamorphoses
Mythological paintings by Peter Paul Rubens